Paramartyria chekiangella is a species of moth belonging to the family Micropterigidae. It was described by Kaltenbach and Speidel, in 1982. It is endemic to China and known from West Tianmu Mountain, its type locality in the Zhejiang province (also romanized as Chekiang).

References

Micropterigidae
Moths of Asia
Insects of China
Endemic fauna of Zhejiang
Moths described in 1982